Manidae is the only extant family of pangolins from superfamily Manoidea. This family comprises three genera (Manis from subfamily Maninae, Phataginus from subfamily Phatagininae, and Smutsia from subfamily Smutsiinae), as well as extinct Fayum pangolin.

Classification and phylogeny

History of classification 
All species of living pangolin had been assigned to the genus Manis until the late 2000s, when research prompted the splitting of extant pangolins into three genera: Manis, Phataginus, and Smutsia.

Taxonomy 
 Family: Manidae (pangolins)
 Subfamily: Maninae (Gray, 1821)
 Genus: Manis (Linnaeus, 1758) (Asiatic pangolins)
 Manis crassicaudata (Gray, 1827) (Indian pangolin)
 Manis pentadactyla (Linnaeus, 1758) (Chinese pangolin)
 Manis sp. (Scale_H4 & Scale_H8)
 †Manis hungarica (Kormos, 1934)
 †Manis lydekkeri (Dubois, 1908)
 Subgenus: Paramanis (Pocock, 1924)
 Manis javanica (Desmarest, 1822) (Sunda pangolin)
 Manis culionensis (de Elera, 1895) (Philippine pangolin)
 †Manis palaeojavanica (Dubois, 1907) (giant asian pangolin)
 Subfamily: Phatagininae (Gaubert, 2017) (small African pangolins)
 Genus: Phataginus (Rafinesque, 1821) (African tree pangolins)
 Phataginus tetradactyla (Linnaeus, 1766) (long-tailed pangolin)
 Phataginus tricuspis (Rafinesque, 1821) (tree pangolin)
 Subfamily: Smutsiinae (Gray, 1873) (large African pangolins)
 Genus: Smutsia (Gray, 1865) (African ground pangolins)
 Smutsia gigantea (Illiger, 1815) (giant pangolin)
 Smutsia temmincki (Smuts, 1832) (ground pangolin)
 †Smutsia olteniensis (Terhune, 2021)
 Incertae sedis
 †Manidae sp. [DPC 3972 and DPC 4364] (Gebo & Rasmussen, 1985) (Fayum pangolin)

Phylogeny 
Phylogenetic position of family Manidae within superfamily Manoidea.

References

External links 
 ZSL Pangolin Conservation 
 Pangolin: Wildlife summary from the African Wildlife Foundation
 Tree of Life of Pholidota
 National Geographic video of a pangolin
 Proceedings of the Workshop on Trade and Conservation of Pangolins Native to South and Southeast Asia (PDF)
 The Phylogeny of Living and Extinct Pangolins (Mammalia, Pholidota) and Associated Taxa: A Morphology Based Analysis (PDF)

  Coronavirus: Revenge of the Pangolins? The New York Times, March 6, 2020.

Pangolins
Mammal families
Taxa named by John Edward Gray